Prachi Dhabal Deb (born 1986) is an Indian cake artist. At Vigyan Bhawan in Delhi, she received an award for her cakes by Union Minister of Road Transport and Highways of India, Nitin Gadkari. At the Bharat Leadership Awards in 2021 she received award from Governor of Maharashtra, Bhagat Singh Koshiyari. She has created a 100-kg cake.

Early life and education 
Prachi Dhabal Deb was born as Prachi Singh in Rewa district of Madhya Pradesh to Rajan Singh and Anuradha Singh in 1986.

Personal life 
Prachi Dhabal Deb is married to Pranabesh Dhabal Deb and they live in Pune. They have a son, Shrihaan Dhabal Deb.

Awards and honours 

 World Book of Records London 2022
 Femina Achievers of the year
 Nitin Gadkari given Swadesh Samman by APN Live

References 

1986 births
Living people
People from Rewa district
People from Pune